Denizli is a village in Cyprus, east of Karavostasi. It is under the de facto control of Northern Cyprus. According to Cyprus Republic, is a quarter of Karavostasi.

Sports 
Turkish Cypriot Denizli Sports Club was founded in 1985; as of 2015, they compete in Cyprus Turkish Football Association (CTFA) K-PET 2nd League.

References

External links
 Xeros in 1964 (video)

Karavostasi
Populated places in Lefke District